Elaine Kontominas Alquist (born August 21, 1944, in Chicago, Illinois) is a former Democratic state senator from California's 13th Senate District. Prior to serving in the Senate, she served in the California State Assembly for six years.

The 13th Senate District (SD 13) is the heart of Silicon Valley in Santa Clara County and includes the cities of San Jose, Santa Clara, Sunnyvale, Mountain View and Gilroy.

She was in office from December 2004 to November 2012. She succeeded John Vasconcellos, who himself succeeded Alquist's husband, the late Al Alquist, who represented the district for 30 years.

Early life and education 
Alquist graduated with a Bachelor of Arts degree from MacMurray College in 1966 and a Master of Arts degree from Washington University in St. Louis in 1967. Her professional career began as an algebra and trigonometry teacher and a counselor in the public schools. In 1981, she served as PTA president and then beginning in 1983 served eight years as a member and then president of the board of education of the Cupertino Union School District.

State Assembly 
Alquist was elected to the California State Assembly's 22nd District in November 1996, and was re-elected in 1998 and 2000. Under the provisions of California's 1990 term limits law, she termed out in 2002.

State Senate 
Alquist was elected to the California State Senate's 13th District in November 2004, and was re-elected in 2008. She termed out in 2012.

References

External links 
 Official site
 Join California Elaine Alquist

1944 births
Schoolteachers from California
American women educators
Democratic Party California state senators
Living people
MacMurray College alumni
Democratic Party members of the California State Assembly
Politicians from Chicago
Politicians from San Jose, California
People from Santa Clara, California
School board members in California
Spouses of California politicians
Washington University in St. Louis alumni
Women state legislators in California
21st-century American politicians
21st-century American women politicians